The International Performers Competition Brno is a competition for musicians held at the Brno International Music Festival in Brno in the Czech Republic.

The Brno International Music Festival has been held at the end of September and the beginning of October each year since 1966. The festival is a member of the European Festivals Association (since 1993). The first International Performers' Competition was held in 1996 and has since become a regular event at the festival. There are six prizes totalling CZK 200,000.

Disciplines, Laureates and Jurors
Organ: Petr Čech, Pavel Svoboda (Czech republic), Anna Pikulska (Poland)
French Horn: Zoltán Szöke (Hungary), Pablo Lago Soto (Spain) 
Tuba: Sergio Finca Quiros (Spain), Carolyn Jantsch (USA)
Double Bass: Stanislau Anishchanka (Belarus), Artem Chirkov (Russia)
Percussion: Sabrina Suk Wai Ma (Hongkong)

Jurors 
James Gourlay, Francis Orval, Susan Landale, Gillian Weir, Helmut Deutsch, David Heyes, Stefan Schäfer, James Gourlay

Cycle of competition categories 
1996 French horn
1997 Pipe organ
1998 Double bass
1999 Percussion
2000 Tuba 
2001 French horn
2002 Pipe organ
2003 Double bass
2004 Percussion duo
2005 Tuba 
2006 French horn
2007 Pipe organ
2008 Double bass
2009 Percussion - Marimba
2010 Tuba 
2011 French horn 
2012 Pipe organ 
2013 Double bass 
2014 Percussion

Concert performances for laureates
performing at the:
 Brno International Music Festival 
 Brno Philharmonic Orchestra 
 South Bohemian Chamber Philharmonic Orchestra České Budějovice 
 Philharmonic Orchestra Hradec Králové 
 Janáček Philharmonic Orchestra Ostrava 
 Moravian Philharmonic Orchestra Olomouc

External links
 Websites of competition
 European Festivals Association

Brno
Music competitions in the Czech Republic
Music festivals in the Czech Republic
Recurring events established in 1996